The 2011 Colorado Rapids season was the club's seventeenth year of existence, as well as its sixteenth season in Major League Soccer, and its sixteenth consecutive season in the top-flight of American soccer.

The Rapids will be entered the season as the defending MLS Cup champions.

Background

The Colorado Rapids are coming off a season, where the club's success was highlighted by winning the MLS Cup, their first postseason title in the process. It was the first time in 17 years that a soccer club based in Colorado won any league/cup title, the last being the Colorado Foxes of the APSL.

In MLS regular season play, the Rapids finished in 7th place overall. The club was eliminated during the top-tier qualification propers of U.S. Open Cup, losing 3–0 to Red Bull New York in the fifth round play-in match.

In the Rocky Mountain Cup derby series against cross-mountain rivals, Real Salt Lake, the clubs tied one another 3–3 in season play. Because of this, the Cup was retained by Salt Lake for the third-consecutive year.

Club

Roster 
As of September 11, 2011.

Team management

Player movement

Transfers

In

Out

Standings

Conference standings

Overall standings

Results summary

Results by round

Matches

Preseason

Major League Soccer

Regular season 

All times Mountain Daylight Time.

Last updated: October 22, 2011Source: Colorado Rapids

MLS Cup Playoffs 

Last updated: November 2, 2011Source: Colorado Rapids

CONCACAF Champions League 

By winning the 2010 MLS Cup final, Colorado Rapids have qualified directly into Group Stage for the 2011-12 edition of the CONCACAF Champions League. It will be Colorado's debut in the Champions League and their first time participating in a CONCACAF club competition since 1997.

Group Stage – Group B

All times Mountain Daylight Time.

Last updated: October 19, 2011Source: Colorado Rapids

U.S. Open Cup 

Last updated: March 30, 2011Source: Colorado Rapids

Miscellany

Allocation ranking 
Colorado is in the #12 position in the MLS Allocation Ranking. The allocation ranking is the mechanism used to determine which MLS club has first priority to acquire a U.S. National Team player who signs with MLS after playing abroad, or a former MLS player who returns to the league after having gone to a club abroad for a transfer fee. A ranking can be traded, provided that part of the compensation received in return is another club's ranking.

International roster spots 
Colorado has 7 international roster spots. Each club in Major League Soccer is allocated 8 international roster spots, which can be traded. Colorado dealt a spot to Vancouver on 24 November 2010. Press reports did not indicate if or when this roster spot is to revert to Colorado. The club also traded a spot to New York Red Bulls on 14 September 2010 in the Macoumba Kandji trade. The trade of this spot was not included in the press release and it is not known when this spot reverts to Colorado. The club acquired a spot permanently from Real Salt Lake on 29 June 2005.

There is no limit on the number of international slots on each club's roster. The remaining roster slots must belong to domestic players. For clubs based in the United States, a domestic player is either a U.S. citizen, a permanent resident (green card holder) or the holder of other special status (e.g., refugee or asylum status).

Future draft pick trades 
Future picks acquired: 2013 SuperDraft Round 4 pick acquired from Houston Dynamo.
Future picks traded: 2012 SuperDraft Round 2 pick traded to San Jose Earthquakes; 2012 SuperDraft Round 3 pick traded to Toronto FC; 2012 SuperDraft conditional pick traded to FC Dallas; 2013 Supplemental Draft Round 3 pick traded to Toronto FC.

References

Colorado Rapids seasons
Colorado Rapids
Colorado Rapids
Colorado Rapids